Stanley Potter may refer to:

 Stanley Potter (canoeist) (1915–1962), Canadian Olympic canoeist
 Stanley Potter (sailor) (1914–1978), British Olympic sailor